Limestone is an unincorporated community in Clarion County, Pennsylvania, United States. Limestone has a post office with ZIP code 16234.

Notes

Unincorporated communities in Clarion County, Pennsylvania
Unincorporated communities in Pennsylvania